Juan Antonio Luna Castro (born May 17, 1959) is a Mexican former football manager.

References

External links 
 

1959 births
Living people
Footballers from Mexico City
Mexican footballers
Club América footballers
Club Necaxa footballers
Club Puebla players
Mexican football managers
San Luis F.C. managers
Club América managers
C.D. Veracruz managers
Club Tijuana managers
Liga MX managers
Liga MX players
Association football midfielders